The 2017–18 Saint Kitts Premier League is the 38th season of the SKNFA Premier League, the top division of football in Saint Kitts, one of the two islands of Saint Kitts and Nevis. The regular season began on 1 October 2017, and the final was played in June 2018.

Regular season

Final four

Championship final

|-
! colspan=5 | First Leg

|-
! colspan=5 | Second Leg

|-
! colspan=5 | Third Leg

Top scorers

See also
2017–18 N1 League

References 

1
Saint Kitts and Nevis
SKNFA Super League seasons